Woolrich is a surname. Notable people with the surname include:

Abel Woolrich (1947–2006), Mexican actor
Cornell Woolrich (1903–1968), American writer
John Woolrich (born 1954), English classical composer

See also
Woolwich (disambiguation)